Marechal Hermes is a planned working-class neighborhood located in the North Zone of Rio de Janeiro, Brazil, founded on May 1, 1913. Surrounding neighborhoods include Bento Ribeiro, Campo dos Afonsos,  Deodoro and  Guadalupe. It takes its name after Brazil's former president Marechal Hermes da Fonseca. 

As of 2000, its HDI is 0.814; the 36th position of the city out of 126.

It contains wide avenues, a theatre, a large hospital, a big church and several schools. Many of its original inhabitants were military men in view of the army and airforce headquarters nearby in Deodoro and Campo dos Afonsos respectively.

Neighbourhoods in Rio de Janeiro (city)